The videography of Canadian rock musician Bryan Adams consists of four video albums and 40 music videos.

Videos

Music videos

References

External links

The Bryan Adams discography

Videographies of Canadian artists
Videography